Changping Station is a station on Line 21 of the Guangzhou Metro that became operational on 20 December 2019.

Station layout

Exits

Gallery

References

Railway stations in China opened in 2019
Guangzhou Metro stations in Huangpu District